The 2000 Mobil 1 British Rally Championship was won by Finland's Marko Ipatti in a Group N Mitsubishi Lancer Evolution 6 ahead of Vauxhall drivers Mark Higgins and Neil Wearden. The 1600cc category championship was won by Proton's Mats Andersson with the Group N title going to Gavin Cox. This was the last year that the championship ran to the F2 regulations.

Calendar

Driver Changes

Mark Higgins moved from Volkswagen to Vauxhall

SEAT, Ford and Renault had withdrawn from the BRC

Gwyndaf Evans left the series to concentrate on testing and development work for SEAT WRC team

Hyundai entered the series with Vauxhall refugee Jarmo Kytolehto and Australian Andrew Pinker driving for the team

David Higgins moved from a production Subaru to the works Peugeot team

Reigning champion Tapio Laukkanen moved to Volkswagen as their solo driver

Martin Rowe only made a one-off appearance for Ford in the new Puma rally car after Renault's withdrawal

Leading Entries

Drivers Championship

Manufacturers Championship

Super 1600 Drivers championship

Group N Drivers Championship

References
 http://www.rallybase.nl/index.php?type=standing&standingid=gbrd2000

External links

British Rally Championship seasons
Rally Championship
British Rally Championship